Cahit Karakaş (born 1928) is a Turkish engineer and a former politician. He served as government minister and Speaker of the Parliament.

Early life
He was born in Bartın in 1928. In 1952, he graduated from Istanbul Technical University. After his doctorate in Berlin Technical University, he returned to Turkey to serve as a civil engineer.

Politician career
He joined the Justice Party and in 1965 he was elected MP from Zonguldak Province. In 1973, he supported the technocratic government of Nihat Erim and he became the Minister of Public Works in the 33rd government of Turkey serving between 26 March 1971 and 10 November 1971, and then the Minister of Transportation from 10 November to 11 December 1971. He later joined the Republican People's Party (CHP). 
 
After the 1977 general elections, in which CHP won the plurality, the parliament failed to elect its speaker for about six months. Finally on 17 November that year, Cahit Karakaş was elected the Speaker of the Turkish parliament. He kept this post until the 1980 Turkish coup d'etat staged on 12 September.

During the civilian regime following 1983, he joined the Populist Party (HP). After the foundation of the Democratic Left Party (DSP), he joined DSP. His membership in the parliament ended by the 1987 general elections.

References

1928 births
People from Bartın
Istanbul Technical University alumni
Technical University of Berlin alumni
Turkish engineers
Turkish expatriates in Germany
Deputies of Zonguldak
Republican People's Party (Turkey) politicians
Justice Party (Turkey) politicians
20th-century Turkish politicians
Democratic Left Party (Turkey) politicians
Speakers of the Parliament of Turkey
Ministers of Public Works of Turkey
Ministers of Transport and Communications of Turkey
Living people